HyperStar is a proposed supersonic jet airliner designed by HyperMach CEO Richard H. Lugg. Lugg said, in a 2016 Altitudes Aviation interview and at a 2014 presentation at the Global Aerospace Summit in Abu Dhabi, that he plans to have the hypersonic transport airborne by June 2028. The HyperStar is expected to reach speeds of up to Mach number 3.6 and fly at an altitude of 80,000 feet (24,380 m). Its propulsion is projected to be 30 percent more fuel efficient than the Rolls-Royce/Snecma Olympus 593 Engine which flew the Concorde.  Hypothetically, the HyperStar would fly three times faster than the speed of the Concorde. It is planned to be powered by two engineered 157,700 thrust SonicBlue HYSCRAM (Hypersonic Superconducting Combustion Ram Accelerated Magnetohydrodynamic Drive ) hybrid hypersonic 6500-X series engines. Sonic boom is expected to be eliminated over land, through electromagnetic drag reduction technology currently under development.

The proposed HyperStar would carry 10 to 20 "luxury" passengers.

See also 
 Supercruise
 Zero Emission Hyper Sonic Transport
 SpaceLiner
 Orient Express X-30 follow-on
 Boeing Sonic Cruiser
 Concorde
 Aerion SBJ

References

Bibliography 
 .
 .
 .

External links 
 

Supersonic transports
Mixed-power aircraft
Proposed aircraft